Eduardo Francisco Guadamud Braulio (born June 11, 1986 in Esmeraldas) is an Ecuadorian weightlifter.

At the 2008 Pan American Weightlifting Championships he won silver in the 94 kg category, with a total of 355 kg.

He competed in the 94 kg class at the 2008 Summer Olympics, but did not finish. He won the bronze medal at the 2011 Pan American Games in the 94 kg event.

Major competitions

Personal bests
 Snatch: 175.0 kg +
 Clean and jerk: 215.0 kg +
 Squat: 2 × 310 kg

References

    Eduardo Guadamud, Comité Olímpico Ecuatoriano
 Athlete Biography GUADAMUD Eduardo at beijing2008

External links
 

1986 births
Living people
Ecuadorian male weightlifters
Olympic weightlifters of Ecuador
Weightlifters at the 2007 Pan American Games
Weightlifters at the 2008 Summer Olympics
Weightlifters at the 2011 Pan American Games
Pan American Games bronze medalists for Ecuador
Pan American Games medalists in weightlifting
Medalists at the 2011 Pan American Games
21st-century Ecuadorian people